Vilmos Pál Tomcsányi (8 February 1880 in Budapest – 7 May 1959) was a Hungarian politician, who served as Interior Minister in 1921. He was the governor of the Governorate of Subcarpathia (Kárpátaljai Kormányzóság) between 1942 and 1944. In May 1944, it was reported that Tomcsányi was arrested and sent to a concentration camp by the authorities for protesting the anti-Jewish measures and legislation taken by the Nazi-collaborating government.

References

 Magyar Életrajzi Lexikon

1880 births
1959 deaths
Politicians from Budapest
Hungarian Interior Ministers
Justice ministers of Hungary